The Marysville baseball team was a minor league baseball team based in Marysville, Kansas in 1910. The Marysville team played as members of the Class D level Eastern Kansas League. The team has no known team moniker, common in the era. The 1910 season was the only season of play for both the league and the Marysville team.

History
The 1910 Marysville team first brought minor league baseball to Marysville, Kansas. Marysville played as charter members of the 1910 Class D level, six–team Eastern Kansas League. The Hiawatha Athletics, Holton, Kansas, Horton, Kansas, Seneca and Sabetha (baseball Sabetha, Kansas teams joined Marysville as Eastern Kansas League charter members. Marysville played without a known team moniker.

After completing 1910 league play, the Marysville team finished the season with an overall record of 38–39. The team finished in 4th place in the Eastern Kansas League standings, playing under managers William Davidson and McDowell. The team had a record of 30–25 under William Davidson and 8–14 under McDowell. Maysville finished 13.0 games behind the 1st place Sabetha team in the six–team league final standings. The Eastern Kansas League permanently folded after their only season of 1910.

The final 1910 Eastern Kansas League standings were led by Sabetha, who ended the season with a 53–28 record, followed by Seneca (46–39), Hiawatha Indians (44–44), Marysville (38–39), Horton (35–38) and Holton / Blue Rapids (26–54). The Eastern Kansas League permanently folded after their only season of 1910.

Marysville, Kansas has not hosted another minor league team.

The ballpark
The 1910 Marysville team was noted to have played minor league home games at Marysville High School Field. The ballpark was reportedly located at Walnut Street & 10th Streets in Maysville, Kansas.

Year–by–year records

Notable alumni
The roster information for the 1910 Marysville team in unknown.

References

External links
Baseball Reference

Defunct minor league baseball teams
Professional baseball teams in Kansas
Defunct baseball teams in Kansas
Baseball teams established in 1910
Baseball teams disestablished in 1910
Eastern Kansas League teams
1910 establishments in Kansas
Marshall County, Kansas